Unlimited Psychic Squad is a spin-off anime series based on the manga Zettai Karen Children by Takashi Shiina focused on main antagonist Kyōsuke Hyōbu and produced by Manglobe. The opening song is "LAST RESOLUTION" by Emblem of THE UNLIMITED and has two versions, one in English and the other in Japanese. It also has eight ending songs: "OUTLAWS" by eyelis, "BRIGHTEST LIGHT", by Yuichi Nakamura & Kishô Taniyama, "DARKNESS NIGHT" by Kōji Yusa & Junichi Suwabe, "BRAND NEW EDEN" by Kōji Yusa, "ADVENT" by Kōji Yusa, "DARKNESS NIGHT (Hyōbu Arrange.)" by Kōji Yusa & Junichi Suwabe, "Sora no Hate (空の涯て;End of the Sky)" by eyelis, and "DARKNESS NIGHT (Hinomiya Arrange.)" by Kōji Yusa & Junichi Suwabe.

Each episode has two titles; one in Japanese and a different one in English.

Episode list

References

Unlimited Psychic Squad